Fu Xuan (217–278), courtesy name Xiuyi, was a Chinese historian, poet, and politician who lived in the state of Cao Wei during the Three Kingdoms period and later under the Jin dynasty. He was one of the most prolific authors of fu poetry of his time. He was a grandson of Fu Xie, a son of Fu Gan, and the father of Fu Xian.

Life
Although he lost his father early and grew up poor, Fu Xuan eventually became famous in literature and music. Nominated as a civil service candidate by the local provincial government, he was appointed as a Gentleman and put in charge of managing the compilation of the historical text Records of the Three Kingdoms (三國志). Later, he became a subordinate of Sima Zhao, the regent of Wei from 255 to 265. He rose through the ranks to become the Administrator of Hongnong Commandery and Colonel of Agriculture. In 265, after Sima Yan usurped the Wei throne and established the Jin dynasty (266–420) with himself as the new emperor, he appointed Fu Xuan as a Regular Mounted Attendant and awarded him the title of a Viscount. Later, Fu Xuan was reassigned to be a Commandant of Escorting Cavalry.

Fu Xuan was recommended to the position of Palace Attendant, but was dismissed from consideration after a falling-out. In 268, he became Palace Assistant Imperial Clerk, and in 259 Minister Coachman. He authored a memorial to suggest ways of preparing for floods and external invasions. He later served as the Colonel-Director of Retainers. He was of such an impatient disposition that whenever he had any memorial or impeachment to submit, he would proceed at once to the palace, no matter what the hour of the day or night, and sit there until he had audience the following dawn. It was while thus waiting that he caught a chill from which he subsequently died.

Fu Xuan also once wrote an essay praising the Chinese mechanical engineers Ma Jun and Zhang Heng, where he lamented the fact that extraordinary talents of natural geniuses were often ignored or neglected by those in charge.

Writings
According to his biography in the Book of Jin, Fu Xuan wrote over a hundred volumes of the Wen Ji, the Fu Zi, and over 120 texts, of which only a small fraction survived to this day. The Fu Zi, for example, survives only in the form of annotations added by Pei Songzhi in the fifth century to the third-century text Records of the Three Kingdoms. Fu Xuan expressed in his writings a critical view of a number of his contemporaries, including both supporters and enemies of Sima Zhao.

Poetry
Fu Xuan's poems, primarily in the yuefu style, are noted for their powerful and empathetic portrayals of women. Translations of several of his sixty-odd surviving poems can be found in the book New Songs from a Jade Terrace by Anne Birrell.

One of the more famous poems by Fu Xuan is "Woman":

See also

Lists of people of the Three Kingdoms
Poetry
Chinese poetry
List of Chinese people
Chinese poets
Feminism
Feminist Movement

References

 Chen, Shou (3rd century). Records of the Three Kingdoms (Sanguozhi)
 Fang, Xuanling (ed.) (648). Book of Jin (Jin Shu).
 
 
 Pei, Songzhi (5th century). Annotations to Records of the Three Kingdoms (Sanguozhi zhu)

217 births
278 deaths
3rd-century Chinese historians
3rd-century Chinese poets
Cao Wei essayists
Cao Wei historians
Cao Wei poets
Cao Wei politicians
Historians from Shaanxi
Jin dynasty (266–420) essayists
Jin dynasty (266–420) historians
Jin dynasty (266–420) poets
Jin dynasty (266–420) politicians
Politicians from Tongchuan
Poets from Shaanxi
Writers from Tongchuan
Three Kingdoms philosophers